Cincinnata is a genus of longhorn beetles of the subfamily Lamiinae.

 Cincinnata allardi Breuning, 1966
 Cincinnata fasciata Jordan, 1894
 Cincinnata konduensis Breuning, 1935
 Cincinnata schoutedeni Breuning, 1935

References

Crossotini